Justin James Speier (born November 6, 1973) is an American former professional baseball pitcher in Major League Baseball.

He attended Brophy College Preparatory in Phoenix, Arizona. Upon graduation from Brophy Prep, Speier attended the University of San Francisco where he played catcher for the Dons. He also attended Nicholls State University.

Speier served in the United States Marine Corps Reserve.

He is the son of former major league player and coach Chris Speier and the cousin of Gabe Speier, a pitcher currently with the Kansas City Royals.

Speier threw a four-seam fastball from an unusual angle which could reach anywhere between 89 and 94 miles per hour. His success tended to be directly proportional to his fastball velocity, because the fastball set up his best strikeout pitch – a baffling, darting forkball, which caused great difficulty for hitters because of his unorthodox arm slot. Speier also threw a two-seamer and a slider.

MLB career

1995–1999

He appeared in one game for the Cubs before he was dealt with two other teammates to the Florida Marlins. He pitched 18 games in Florida and by the time next season arrived was coming out of the bullpen for the Atlanta Braves. For the season, he appeared in 19 games. On November 23, Speier was claimed off waivers by the Cleveland Indians.

2000–2003

He started the  season back with Cleveland, winning his first two decisions of the season before he was traded to the New York Mets and just 10 days later without appearing in a game for the Mets, claimed off waivers by the Colorado Rockies. With the Rockies, Speier recorded a 4–3 record in 42 games for the team. Between Cleveland & Colorado, Speier finished with an overall record of 6–3 in 76.2 innings pitched.

In 2002, Speier was 5–1 with a 4.33 ERA.

In 2003, he appeared in a career high 72 games. His overall win–loss record with Colorado was 12–5 while picking up his first 10 big league saves. He was then traded to the Toronto Blue Jays on December 14, in a trade involving three teams.

2004–2010
During his first season with the Blue Jays, he finished the season with an above average 3.91 ERA, while posting a 3–8 record and adding 7 more saves to his career total.

In , his ERA went down from 3.91 in his first year with Toronto to 2.57. He also went 3-2 and appeared in 66 games, which was three more appearances than he had in 2004.

During the  season, Speier compiled a 2–0 record, with a 2.96 ERA and 25 holds. Speier become a free agent after the 2006 season, and on November 19, 2006, Speier signed a four-year contract worth $18 million with the Los Angeles Angels of Anaheim.

In his first year with the Angels, Speier had an ERA of 2.88 in 51 games.

In 2008, Speier had a career worst, sporting a record of 2–8 with a 5.03 ERA in 62 games. In 2009, his ERA went higher, finishing at 5.18 in 41 games.

Speier was then released on August 11, 2009.

On January 28, 2010, Speier signed a minor league contract with the Colorado Rockies with an invitation to spring training. He was released on April 3 after not making the team. Upon his release, he retired from baseball at the age of 36.

See also
 List of second-generation Major League Baseball players

References

External links

1973 births
Living people
American expatriate baseball players in Canada
Arizona League Angels players
Atlanta Braves players
Baseball players from California
Buffalo Bisons (minor league) players
Chicago Cubs players
Cleveland Indians players
Colorado Rockies players
Colorado Springs Sky Sox players
Daytona Cubs players
Dunedin Blue Jays players
Florida Marlins players
Iowa Cubs players
Los Angeles Angels players
Major League Baseball pitchers
Nicholls Colonels baseball players
Rancho Cucamonga Quakes players
Richmond Braves players
San Francisco Dons baseball players
Toronto Blue Jays players
United States Marines